Makers: Women Who Make America is a 2013 documentary film about the struggle for women's equality in the United States during the last five decades of the 20th century.  The film was narrated by Meryl Streep and distributed by the Public Broadcasting Service as a three-part, three-hour television documentary in February 2013.  Makers features interviews with women from all social strata, from politicians like Hillary Clinton and television stars like Ellen DeGeneres and Oprah Winfrey, to flight attendants, coal miners and phone company workers.

In 2014, PBS commissioned season 2 of Makers: Women Who Make America, a six-episode series that would expand on the themes of the 2013 documentary, as a continuation of PBS's broader Makers partnership with AOL. The series premiered on September 30, 2014.

Background
Project founder and executive producer Dyllan McGee of McGee Media began what eventually became the Makers project in 2004.  Originally, McGee set out to make a film about Gloria Steinem, but Steinem turned down the proposal. "She didn’t want it to be all about her – she wanted the bigger picture", McGee recalls. McGee named the documentary Makers to emphasize the sense of momentum in a continuing, ongoing women's movement.

Synopsis
The first part of the film begins in the 1950s and 1960s ("Awakening"), and follows the impact of Betty Friedan's The Feminine Mystique (1963) on women in the United States. College student Kathrine Switzer runs the Boston Marathon as a registered competitor and challenges the ban on women. Judy Blume is featured, remarking that women "went to college; In case God forbid they had to go to work." During the 1950s and 1960s, it was looked down upon for any woman to have the job of a man. Gloria Steinem remembers, "You were supposed to be pretty and happy all the time." She didn't remember any serious or smart women during those years. During World War II, women worked in factories because so many of the men were gone. The second part takes place in the 1970s ("Changing the World"), and covers the sexual revolution and abortion debate. The third and last part of the film ("Charting a New Course") ends in the 1980s and 1990s, and discusses issues facing women in the workforce, violence against women, the Clarence Thomas Supreme Court nomination and sexual harassment.

Production
Makers was produced by Storyville Films in partnership with Kunhardt McGee Productions and WETA-TV, and sponsored by AOL.

Release
The documentary is linked to Makers.com, a collaborative project between PBS and AOL featuring videos of hundreds of women who contributed to the struggle for women's equality in the United States.  Referring to the project, McGee said in 2014, "The goal of Makers is to be the largest collection of women's stories ever assembled." The video project went live in February 2012.  The film premiered at Alice Tully Hall at the Lincoln Center for the Performing Arts in New York City on February 6, 2013.  The documentary was first broadcast on PBS on February 26, 2013.

Reception
David Wiegand of the San Francisco Chronicle called the documentary "one of the best and most far-reaching films about the modern women's movement".

Featured women
The documentary features Secretary of State Hillary Clinton, comedian Ellen DeGeneres, Madeleine Albright, Christiane Amanpour, Geraldine Ferraro, Carol Burnett, Condoleezza Rice, Phyllis Schlafly, and women who appear on Forbes Most Powerful Women list. Lesser known women, such as Maria Pepe, who was instrumental in establishing the right of girls to play Little League Baseball, are also featured.

Makers Season 2

On January 21, 2014, as part of its partnership with AOL in the Makers "initiative", PBS announced a six-episode series that would continue examining the themes of the original three-hour documentary. Each of the series's six episodes focuses on a different career field, and prominent women in that field. The series, referred to as "Makers Season 2" by PBS, premiered on September 30, 2014.

Episodes

Notes

References

Further reading
 "The women who helped shape America". CBS News. February 25, 2013.
 Groer, Annie (February 25, 2013) "Fifty years of feminism in 'Makers: Women Who Make America'". The Washington Post.
 Marcotte, Amanda (February 27, 2013). "PBS Gives Feminist History Its Due in Three-Hour Documentary, But Skimps on Today". Slate. 
 Rose, Charlie (February 25, 2013). "Makers: Women Who Make America". Charlie Rose.
 Strachan, Alex (February 22, 2013). "Gloria Steinem debuts new doc Makers: The Women Who Make America". Postmedia News.  
 Yorio, Yara (February 26, 2013). "'Makers: Women Who Make America' chronicles women's movement of last 50 years". The Record.

External links
 Makers on PBS
 

2013 American television series debuts
2010s American documentary television series
History of women's rights in the United States
Films directed by Barak Goodman
Documentaries about women